The 2016–17 season was the East Bengal FC's 97th season in existence. The club had already won the Calcutta Football League and became the runners of 2016 Bordoloi Trophy.

Pre-Season Overview
The club signed Calum Angus, an English defender to strengthen the defence for the Calcutta League. The Red and Gold Brigade are hoping to seal the CFL championship and set a hepta record. With the help of recent performances, the club clinched the 74th spot in the Asian Football Confederation club ranking, the highest among all Indian football clubs.

Season Overview

August
The club started their Calcutta Football League campaign by beating Bhawanipore by 2–1. Then they went on winning all the matches in the league.

September
Maintaining their winning streak of August, East Bengal went on to win all the matches in the league to win the Calcutta Football League for a record consecutive 7 times, bettering their own record of 1970–75. Mohun Bagan decided not to play the Kolkata Derby and East Bengal got a walk over which ensured the hepta league win.  East Bengal were crowned champions for a record 38th time in history and for the 7th consecutive season. This is also the 3rd time that they have won the league without dropping a single point.

October
The club went to play the 2016 Bordoloi Trophy. The team draw set East Bengal in Group B on the fixture of this tour. Due to the absence of almost all the main and first team players of the club (all out on loan in different clubs of Indian Super League), the junior and reserve bench players had taken part in it. The club brought Oluwaunmi Somide Adeleja on loan for the tournament. East Bengal started off well by defeating Bangladesh club  Bongobi Agragami by 6–0. The club kept its winning streak by defeating United Sikkim F.C. by a comfortable margin of 2–0 and then ASEB SC by 3–0. Then the club went into the semis where they defeated  Shillong Lajong F.C. by 1–0 to enter into the final. East Bengal FC played the final against Three Star Club (Nepal) where they lost 1–2 in extra time. The brilliant performance of the junior players throughout the tournament came to an end with the defeat in final match. But the fight of the junior brigade was appreciated wholeheartedly by the supporters of the club.

January
The club roped in Haitian Wedson Anselme from Sheikh Jamal Dhanmondi Club Bangladesh and Willis Plaza from Trinidad and Tobago to strengthen the forward line along with Robin Singh, Jackichand Singh, Thongkhosiem Haokip, Rowllin Borges and Romeo Fernandes to strengthen the squad. East Bengal also brought Ivan Bukenya from Uganda to fortify their defence. 
The team played against Aizawl F.C. in the 2016-17 I-League opener, but drew the match on the dying minutes thanks to a late equalizer from Ivan Bukenya. Then they went to Pune to play DSK Shivajians where the forward line sparkled and East Bengal won 2–1. Then they defeated Churchill Brothers S.C. by 2–0. Then on 22 January 2017, East Bengal faced the defending champions Bengaluru FC. The defending champions went ahead early by a goal from C.K. Vineeth but East Bengal rallied from behind to win it 2–1 with the goals scored by Ivan Bukenya and Robin Singh. East Bengal continued their winning streak and won 6 games on the trot to lead the league table. They face their arch Rivals Mohun Bagan on 12 February at Siliguri.

February

The month of February didn't start too well for the Red and Gold brigade. Draws against arch rival Mohun Bagan and Shillong Lajong F.C. and then a 1–0 loss away to Aizawl F.C. halted the victory march. The team looked out of shape and confidence when they faced Bengaluru FC away on 25 February at Sree Kanteerava Stadium. However, East Bengal turned all predictions aside and won the match 3–1 thanks to a brace from Robin Singh and a wonder strike from Wedson Anselme. With 7 matches to go, East Bengal currently sits at the top of the table for now.

March
By the time March came, East Bengal started bottling, like they always do. East Bengal were leading at the beginning of the March, but ended the season in the third position.

Transfers

In

Out

Kit
Supplier: Shiv Naresh / Sponsors: Kingfisher Premium, Peerless

First-team squad

Technical Staff

Competitions

Overall

Overview

Calcutta Football League

Table

Fixtures & results

Bordoloi Trophy

Group B

Knock-out Stage

Fixtures & results

I-League

Table

Fixtures & results

Federation Cup

Knock-out Stage

Fixtures & results

Statistics

Appearances
 Players with no appearances are not included in the list.

Goal Scorers

See also
 2016–17 in Indian football

References

East Bengal Club seasons
2016–17 I-League by team